The rank insignia of the Italian Navy are worn on epaulettes of shirts and white jackets, and on sleeves for navy jackets and mantels.

Rank structure
40px|right

Officers 

Notes:
1 The rank of "ammiraglio" (admiral) is assigned to the only naval officer promoted as chief of the defense staff.

2 The rank of "ammiraglio di squadra con incarichi speciali" (squadron admiral with special assignments) is assigned to the naval officer promoted as chief of the naval staff and/or as secretary of defense.

3 As officer designated, the rank of "aspirante guardiamarina" is comparable to the Royal Navy midshipman.

Non-commissioned officers and ratings 

Notes:
1No rank insignia, sailors just wear category or specialty badge, in this case the rating of "tecnico di macchine" (machinist's mate).

Notes

Bibliography
 Decreto legislativo 15 marzo 2010 n.66

References

See also 
 Italian Army ranks
 Italian Air Force ranks

Marina Militare
Military insignia
Military ranks of Italy